SAfiYAA is a London-based fashion label founded in 2011 by Daniela Karnuts and named after her daughter, 'Safiya'. She started the company with 12 dress designs and the goal of being "created by women for women." Famous fans of the brand include Jennifer Lopez and Kate Winslet. In 2018, the Duchess of Sussex, Meghan Markle, wore a SAfiYAA evening gown while at a State dinner in Fiji with Prince Harry and the following month in London at her first Royal Variety Performance.

References 

Clothing companies based in London